McAuley Catholic College is an independent Roman Catholic co-educational day school, located at 4 Hennessy Drive, Clarenza NSW, 2460, in the Northern Rivers area of New South Wales, Australia.

The College is affiliated with the Australasian Mercy Secondary Schools Association (AMSSA) and is administered by the Roman Catholic Diocese of Lismore.

History
The school has existed in various forms and structures for many years with mergers and amalgamations at different stages. The Sisters of Mercy arrived in Grafton in 1884 and began ministry in Catholic Education at that time. The most recent history of the College shows an amalgamation of St Mary's College, St Aloysius' College and Holy Spirit College into Catherine McAuley College in 1990, followed by a name change to McAuley Catholic College when relocation to the Clarenza site occurred in 2004. The College's ethos has been derived from the traditions of two religious orders: the Sisters of Mercy and the Marist Brothers. Since the late 1800s the Sisters of Mercy have been involved in Catholic Education in Grafton and continue to have a significant presence and mission in the local community. The college is named after Catherine McAuley founder of the Sisters of Mercy.

Principals

Campus
The original campus of the college was situated on the banks of the Clarence River in central Grafton. Early in 2004, McAuley re-located to its current campus, a purpose-built educational facility in Clarenza, New South Wales. The campus has facilities which includes catering for all subject areas such as technology and applied studies, science, performing and visual arts. There is also a fully equipped library and sporting facilities, including a hall and gym. Additional facilities include the Mercy Prayer Garden, healthy canteen and sporting oval.

Curriculum
As a secondary school in New South Wales, the college teaches Year 7 to 12 students in accordance with the State Government's education curriculum, as determined by the Board of Studies. Year 12 students are accredited with their Higher School Certificate (HSC).

McAuley follows a curriculum which includes English, Mathematics, Science, History and Geography, Personal Development, Health & Physical Education, languages including French and Indonesian, Technology (Mandatory), Music, Drama and Visual Arts. Year groups are divided into three or four classes for each subject. Practical subjects such as Technology (Mandatory) and Visual Arts generally have smaller classes than those in other subjects. During the course of a day, students will move to specialist classrooms to undertake specific studies. The timetable is organised around a ten-day cycle. Each teacher in the Senior School is a specialist in their subject area and teaches students from Years 7 through to Year 12. Subject teachers design lessons and assessment tasks with the aim of improving each student's understanding of curriculum content.

Co-curriculum
The school provides opportunities for involvement in: sport (local and representative), debating, mock trial, retreats, liturgies, reflection days, excursions, musicals, visits to other productions, swimming, athletics, cross-country, camps, academic competitions, dance, public speaking, leadership training, gifted and talented camps, Modern and Ancient History (European) Tours, newspaper production, visits to university, open-days and HSC seminars.

House system
The house system at McAuley Catholic College is the structure under which all activities – religious, academic, pastoral, cultural, community, social, sporting – take place. On enrolment each student is allocated to one of four houses – Tracey, McCarthy, Champagnat, Mercy. Seven homerooms operate within each house with each homeroom group containing students from each Year group. The intention is for students to remain with their homeroom group and homeroom teacher for each of their six years of secondary schooling. This allows for connectedness with a particular homeroom teacher and peer support/mentoring by older students within the homeroom. The homeroom teacher is the teacher primarily responsible for the welfare of each student in his/her homeroom. The year coordinator is the senior teacher who is the coordinator of the year group.

Champagnat (Blue) Marcellin Champagnat (1789–1840) was the founder of the Marist Brothers. He was ordained as a priest in 1816 and worked in France in an isolated and culturally poor region. Champagnat strongly believed in the benefit of education for all levels of society. He dedicated his life to educating young men, intellectually and spiritually, so that they could work with children deprived of a Christian education.
McCarthy (Green) Father Timothy McCarthy was the first parish priest in the region. He was appointed from 1854 until 1862 to the area encompassing the New England Plains, east to the Pacific Ocean and north to the Tweed River. Father McCarthy was based in Armidale and it took three months for him to travel around his District. Father McCarthy obtained land and collected money for the erection of a church in South Grafton.
Mercy (Gold) The Sisters of Mercy were founded by Catherine McAuley (1778–1841). Catherine McAuley was a woman of faith who embarked on a path of service to the poor in Ireland. In 1884 Mother Stanislaus and her companions arrived in Grafton. The Sisters of Mercy have been involved in Catholic education in Grafton ever since. The Sisters of Mercy today continue their endeavours in education and in the local community including helping the poor, needy, elderly and youth.
Tracey (Red) In 1860, Archbishop Polding administered Confirmation for the first time in Grafton. The archbishop urged the new families to realise how important it was that their children be raised and taught in a Christian way. This was the impetus that saw the first Catholic school opened in the area with Edward Tracey the first teacher at the school. The school was situated in the original weatherboard church in South Grafton.

Notable alumni 

Troy Cassar-Daley, country and western singer
 Jed Holloway, current New South Wales Waratahs player

 Verity Simmons, netball player

See also

 List of Catholic schools in New South Wales
 Catholic education in Australia

References

External links

Association of Marist Schools of Australia
Catholic secondary schools in New South Wales
Educational institutions established in 1990
Grafton, New South Wales
1990 establishments in Australia